Perry Gladstone Christie PC, MP (born 21 August 1943) is a Bahamian former politician who served as Prime Minister of the Bahamas from 2002 to 2007 and from 2012 to 2017. He is the second longest-serving Bahamian elected parliamentarian (behind the late Sir Roland Symonette who was first elected to parliament in 1925 and served until 1977), representing the Centreville constituency from 1977 to 2017. He is also a former athlete. His Progressive Liberal Party is the oldest Bahamian political party, holding solid majorities in the Bahamian Parliament several times in its long history.

Political career

Christie is believed to have been the youngest Bahamian ever appointed to the Senate. Named as a Senator by Prime Minister Lynden Pindling in November 1974, Christie served in that capacity until June 1977. In January 1977 he was appointed chairman of the Gaming Board, which regulates casinos in The Bahamas.

Receiving the PLP's nomination for the Centreville constituency in the 1977 general election, Christie was elected Member of Parliament for that constituency, and shortly afterward appointed Minister of Health and National Insurance. During the June 1982 general election, he was re-elected Member of Parliament for Centreville, and was once again appointed to the Prime Minister's Cabinet, but as Minister of Tourism.

A dynamic Minister, Christie moved tourism in The Bahamas to new heights. In 1984, however, he was dismissed from the Cabinet, and during the 1987 general election ran as an independent candidate. He retained his seat in the Centreville constituency. Three years later – in March 1990 – Christie returned to the fold of the Progressive Liberal Party, and was appointed Minister of Agriculture, Trade and Industry by the Prime Minister. Christie's ministerial responsibilities included the Ministry of Agriculture, Trade and Industry; mining, geological surveys, petroleum, fuel, oils and petrochemicals, industries encouragement, manufacturing, relations with The Bahamas Agricultural and Industrial Corporation, relations with The Bahamas National Trust, Andros reef and blue holes, and the Department of Agriculture, Fisheries and Co-operatives.

In January 1993, following the PLP's defeat in the August 1992 general election, Christie was elected Co-deputy leader of the PLP with responsibility for party activities outside parliament. Victorious in the newly created Farm Road constituency in the general election, he was elected leader of the PLP at a special convention on 5 April 1997 and appointed as Leader of the Opposition by the Governor-General on 7 April. Christie thus succeeded Lynden Pindling, who had led the PLP since 1956.

Perry held the additional portfolio of Minister of Finance from 2002 to 2007, and from 2012 to 2017.

Events since 2007
Christie's party, the Progressive Liberal Party (PLP), was defeated in the May 2007 general election, taking 18 seats against 23 for the Free National Movement (FNM), and Christie conceded defeat in a phone call to FNM leader Hubert Ingraham. After the new FNM government was sworn in, Christie was sworn in as leader of the Official Opposition.

In November 2009, Christie was overwhelmingly elected, and returned as Leader of the PLP at its Annual General Convention, garnering more than 80% of the vote over Dr. Bernard Nottage.

Christie was re-elected as Prime Minister of the Bahamas on 7 May 2012.

Christie ran his campaign on reducing crime (specifically murder) and The Bahamas has seen a yearly increase in murders since his inauguration.

Christie has brought programmes like Urban Renewal.

Christie also introduced Value Added Tax at a rate of 7.5%. The money raised from VAT was slated to pay off National Debt.

No Freedom of Information Act has even been implemented under his government, although while in opposition he pushed for it.

Multiple human rights violations have been investigated under his leadership, none of which have been solved.

10 May 2017 General Elections
In a landslide defeat by the Free National Movement (FNM), the PLP was defeated in the 10 May 2017 general elections with the FNM winning 35 seats, and the PLP winning only 4 seats.  The historic win also resulted in the unseating of Perry Christie from his Centerville seat by a mere four votes, a constituency which he had represented for 40 consecutive years.

Second Government (2012-2017)

References

External links
 Government of the Bahamas web page of The Rt Hon. Perry Gladstone Christie
 Rise Up Sweet Island details an account of opposition to Christie's anchor development policy
 Rashad Rolle, "Audio: Pm Says Of Journalists: 'To Hell With Them'", Tribune 242, 27 March 2015.

|-

|-

1943 births
Alumni of City, University of London
Alumni of the University of Birmingham
Living people
Members of the Privy Council of the United Kingdom
People from Nassau, Bahamas
Finance ministers of the Bahamas
Tourism ministers of the Bahamas
Prime Ministers of the Bahamas
Progressive Liberal Party politicians
Promise Keepers
Bahamian male athletes
Central American and Caribbean Games medalists in athletics
21st-century Bahamian politicians